The Walton House is a historic building in the Lawrenceville neighborhood of Pittsburgh, Pennsylvania. A designated Pittsburgh historic landmark, the house and its neighboring structures exemplify the form and scale of buildings constructed in Lawrenceville during the post Civil War era.

History 
The Walton House was built circa 1868 by William and Martha Walton, who emigrated from England and settled in Pennsylvania sometime in the 1860s. During that decade, Walton operated a jewelry store on Market Street in Lawrenceville. The couple's former property also includes the two adjoining houses at 4416 Plummer St. and 152 45th St. All three buildings were built between 1865 and 1872, but 4412–4414 Plummer St. is thought to be the oldest. During the 1870s, part of the property was operated as an inn and tavern.

Architecture 
The Walton House is a two-story, side-gabled double house of frame construction, with vinyl siding installed over the original clapboards. The building is five bays wide with 1-over-1 sash windows used throughout. The corner unit (4412 Plummer St.) has a two-story shed-roofed extension at the rear. The adjoining house at 4416 Plummer St. has an unusual covered breezeway connecting to the rear of the property, which may be related to its use as an inn during the 1870s. The Walton House and its neighbors exemplify the form and scale of buildings constructed in Lawrenceville during the post Civil War era.

References

External links 
 "Resolution providing for the designation of Walton House as a Historic Structure (legislative history and videos of city officials discussing the fate of Walton House). Pittsburgh, Pennsylvania: The City of Pittsburgh, 2015.

City of Pittsburgh historic designations
Houses in Pittsburgh
Lawrenceville (Pittsburgh)